Antal van der Duim (born 16 September 1987) is a Dutch professional tennis player. He competes mainly on the ATP Challenger Tour and ITF Futures, both in singles and doubles. He reached his highest ATP singles ranking, No. 214 on 31 October 2016, and his highest ATP doubles ranking, No. 149, on 20 April 2015.

ATP Challenger and ITF Futures finals

Singles: 30 (14–16)

Doubles: 56 (38–18)

Junior Grand Slam finals

Singles: 1 (1 runner-up)

References

External links
 
 

1987 births
Living people
Dutch male tennis players
People from Weststellingwerf
Sportspeople from Friesland
21st-century Dutch people
20th-century Dutch people